Spooner Hall was built in 1893-94 as the University of Kansas' first library building. The Richardsonian Romanesque structure was designed by architect Henry Van Brunt and built with funds bequeathed by William B. Spooner, a Massachusetts leather merchant who had a family connection to the university. As originally built, the building housed a reading room on the ground floor and meeting space on the upper level, with book stacks in a five-story section.

Spooner Hall is constructed of rough-faced gray Oread Limestone blocks quarried in the immediate vicinity of Mount Oread. Red Dakota sandstone accents the quoins, columns, beltlines and sills. The roof is a steeply pitched gable with clay tile roof covering, accented by a sculpted owl on the peak of the western gable. The original interior was completely modified for use as an art gallery.

In 1924 Spooner Hall was superseded by a new library. In 1926 the building became the Spooner-Thayer Museum of Art. Later renamed the University of Kansas Museum of Art, the collection moved into the Spencer Museum of Art in 1978.  It was placed on the National Register of Historic Places on July 15, 1974. The building presently houses anthropology collections and acts as a conference center.

References

External links

Spooner Hall at the Historic Mount Oread Fund
"Spooner or Later" at KU History
 

University and college buildings on the National Register of Historic Places in Kansas
School buildings completed in 1894
University of Kansas campus
Historic American Buildings Survey in Kansas
Richardsonian Romanesque architecture in Kansas
Library buildings completed in 1894
National Register of Historic Places in Douglas County, Kansas
Libraries on the National Register of Historic Places in Kansas
Libraries in Kansas
University and college academic libraries in the United States